Christian Demuynck (born 24 July 1947) was a member of the Senate of France. He represented the Seine-Saint-Denis department and is a member of the Union for a Popular Movement Party.

References
Page on the Senate website (in French)

1947 births
Living people
French Senators of the Fifth Republic
Union for a Popular Movement politicians
Senators of Seine-Saint-Denis
People from Val-de-Marne
Mayors of places in Île-de-France
Members of Parliament for Seine-Saint-Denis